Robert Baker (born November 28, 1927) is an American former gridiron football coach. He served as the head coach for the Calgary Stampeders of the Canadian Football League (CFL) from 1975 to 1976 and as the head football coach at Pace University from 1989 to 1991. He was a coach for 40 seasons before retiring in 1991.

Early life and education
Baker was born on November 28, 1927, in Lima, Ohio. He went to Bluffton High School in Indiana. Baker went to college at Ball State. While in college he played quarterback, running back, and kicker. He led them to an 8–0 record in 1949. He was named All-State in 1950. He would later be inducted into Ball State's Athletic Hall of Fame.

Coaching career

Royertown High School
Shortly after graduating college, he went to Royertown High School to become a coach. In 1951 he was an assistant coach and was promoted to head coach the next year. He was the Head Coach for 7 seasons.

Ft. Wayne South High School
In 1959 he was an assistant coach for Ft. Wayne South High School.

Anderson High School (Madison Heights, Indiana)
From 1960 to 1965, he was the head coach for Anderson High School (Madison Heights, Indiana).

Indiana
His first year of college coaching was in 1966 with the Indiana Hoosiers. He stayed with them for 7 seasons before going to Illinois. He was the wide receivers coach.

Illinois
For one season (1973) he was the assistant coach at Illinois.

Calgary Stampeders
His first year of professional coaching came in 1974 as the Assistant Coach for the Calgary Stampeders. He was named Head Coach at the end of 1975. After 1976 he went to Michigan State University.

Michigan State
For three seasons, he was an assistant coach for the Michigan State Spartans. He was there from 1977 to 1979.

Arizona State
For about a season in the 1980s, he was the offensive coordinator for the Arizona State Sun Devils.

Los Angeles Rams
His first year of National Football League (NFL) coaching was in 1983. He was the Los Angeles Rams quarterbacks coach. He was there for two seasons (1983 to 1984).

Detroit Lions
From 1985 to 1988, he was the offensive coordinator for the Detroit Lions.

Winnipeg Blue Bombers
The next season he spent with the Winnipeg Blue Bombers of the Canadian Football League (CFL). He was their qarterbacks and receivers coach.

Pace
From 1989 to 1991, he was the head coach of the Pace Setters.

Head coaching record

College

Awards and honors

Playing honors
 All-State (1950)

Coaching honors
 Ball State Coach of the Year (1977)
 Ball State Athletic Hall of Fame (1977)
 Indiana Football Hall of Fame (1981)

References

1927 births
Living people
Arizona State Sun Devils football coaches
Ball State Cardinals football players
Calgary Stampeders coaches
Detroit Lions coaches
Illinois Fighting Illini football coaches
Indiana Hoosiers football coaches
Los Angeles Rams coaches
National Football League offensive coordinators
Michigan State Spartans football coaches
Pace Setters football coaches
High school football coaches in Indiana
People from Bluffton, Indiana
Sportspeople from Lima, Ohio
Coaches of American football from Indiana
Players of American football from Indiana